The Haupt is a mountain of the Urner Alps, located between the Klein Melchtal and the Melchtal in the canton of Obwalden. Its east side consists of steep limestone cliffs overlooking Stöckalp and Melchsee-Frutt. On its west side it overlooks the Älggi-Alp.

References

External links
 Haupt on Hikr

Mountains of the Alps
Mountains of Obwalden
Mountains of Switzerland
Kerns, Switzerland